Frank Pietrzok (20 June 1964 – 3 February 2022) was a German politician.

A member of the Social Democratic Party of Germany, he served in the Bürgerschaft of Bremen from 1999 to 2005. He died in a paragliding accident at La Unión, Colombia, on 3 February 2022, at the age of 57.

References

1964 births
2022 deaths
21st-century German politicians
People from Xanten
Social Democratic Party of Germany politicians
Members of the Bürgerschaft of Bremen
Free University of Berlin alumni
Accidental deaths in Colombia
Accidental deaths from falls